You is an American psychological thriller novel series, written by Caroline Kepnes, and television series, developed by Greg Berlanti and Sera Gamble, following bookshop owner Joe Goldberg in a satire of romantic comedies, as he struggles to overcome his homicidal tendencies while searching for true love. For the latter's first season, it aired on Lifetime, moving to Netflix from its second season onward. The novel series consists of You (2013), Hidden Bodies (2016), You Love Me (2021), and For You and You Only (2023).

The following is a list of characters that have appeared in the novel and television series.

Overview 
 Key

Main cast

Recurring cast

Main characters

Joe Goldberg 

Joseph Goldberg (Penn Badgley) is a bookstore manager at Mooney's who stalks and dates Guinevere Beck in the first season. In the second season, he goes by the name Will Bettelheim and works as a bookstore clerk at Anavrin, and stalks and dates Love Quinn. Joe, then gets married to Love, has a son named Henry and moves to the Californian suburbs. However, his obsessive behavior still finds a way back into their lives, rupturing his marriage. At the end of season 3, Joe is forced to kill Love and moves to Europe, where is given the cover identity of Jonathan Moore, a university English professor. While in London, Joe undergoes a psychotic break that causes his personality to dissociate, leading him to unconsciously commit a string of murders. During this time, Joe enters a passionate relationship with art dealer and philanthropic heiress Kate Galvin. He and Kate eventually move back to New York, where Kate takes over her family business and rehabilitates Joe's public image. Joe is portrayed as a teenager by Gianni Ciardiello in season one, and as a child by Aidan Wallace and Jack Fisher in season two and season three respectively.

Guinevere Beck 
Guinevere Beck (Elizabeth Lail; season 1, special guest season 2 & 4 part 2) is a broke NYU graduate student and an aspiring writer who Joe falls in love with. She is best friends with Peach and close friends with Lynn and Annika. She was also in an on-again, off-again relationship with her ex, Benji, but becomes the girlfriend of Joe Goldberg. However, she ends up being murdered by him.

Paco 
Paco (Luca Padovan; season 1) is Joe's young neighbor and Claudia’s son. He and Joe form a strong bond over their shared love of books. Paco also has a tumultuous relationship with his mother’s boyfriend, Ron.

Ethan Russell 
Ethan Russell (Zach Cherry; season 1) is a bookstore clerk who works with Joe.

Peach Salinger 
Peach Salinger (Shay Mitchell; season 1) is a wealthy and influential socialite and Beck's best friend whom she met at Brown University.
Peach is revealed to be secretly obsessed with Beck and has an adversarial relationship with Joe.

Love Quinn 
Love Quinn (Victoria Pedretti; season 2–3, special guest season 4) is an aspiring chef and health guru in Los Angeles. Love is the heiress to a self-care business started by her wealthy parents, who launched the grocery store Anavrin ("Nirvana" spelled backwards) when Love and her younger brother Forty were teenagers. Love noticed Forty being sexually abused by Sofia, the family's au pair and murdered her after drugging Forty, allowing him to believe he blacked out and killed Sofia himself. Love's parents elected to cover up the death to protect Forty, who grew up with severe unresolved trauma and developed an addiction to alcohol and drugs. Love made it her responsibility during adulthood to manage Forty's sobriety. She later went to culinary school and fell in love with a mute man named James whom she sought to marry, but he ultimately died of a medical condition. 

Love begins the series as an employee at Anavrin. She meets Joe - who also begins working at the store under the pseudonym Will Bettelheim - and quickly becomes attracted to him. She secretly discovers that Joe has been stalking her and keeps a glass cage inside his storage unit, which she takes as signs of his passion. She also deduces Beck as Joe's ex-girlfriend via her memoir and deems her undeserving of him. As she and Joe become closer, Love is visited by Candace (who was posing as Forty's girlfriend), who reveals that Joe is living under an alias and tried to murder Candace. Love feigns disbelief but cuts ties with Joe, only to realize she still holds feelings for him. Love learns that Joe was in a sexual relationship with his landlord Delilah and later discovers her being held hostage inside the glass cage. Love murders Delilah to tie up loose ends. Candace later discovers the storage unit herself and traps Joe inside the cage with Delilah's corpse, then calls Love to the unit to prove Joe's psychopathy to her. Love, however, murders Candace and reveals to Joe that she murdered Delilah and has been obsessed with him. Joe attempts to kill her, but she reveals she is pregnant with his child. Forty realizes Joe is a serial killer and calls Love and Joe to Anavrin; he warns Love to stay clear of Joe and prepares to execute him at gunpoint, but is shot dead by police officer David Fincher. Joe and Love move to a suburb outside San Francisco to raise their child. 

Love and Joe will have to adjust to the life of parents. Love along with Joe meets Sherry Conrad in a cafeteria. Love and Joe go to Sherry's party. Love listens as Sherry and her friends talk bad about her and then gets to know more about Natalie Engler (Michaela McManus), her neighbor; which makes Love decide to open her bakery. Love discovers Joe's box where she keeps belongings from her obsessions, there she finds something from Natalie discovering that she is Joe's new obsession. She calls Natalie to see her bakery location, and in a moment of jealousy; Love kills Natalie. She asks Joe to help her cover up the death of her neighbor. Love meets Theo  who flirts with her. Later, Love and Joe tell the bakery about her, and they put Joe's vault in the basement. Love discovers that Theo is the son of her neighbor, Matthew Engler and therefore Natalie's stepson.

Theo flirts with Love again at her bakery, but she rebuffs his advances. Later, Henry contracts measles. Love and Joe decide to frame Matthew. Although they fail. While Henry recovers, Joe and Love decide not to frame Matthew. The next day, Gil, a neighbor, reveals to Love that Henry contracted measles from his twin daughters and that he and his wife are both anti-vaccination. As he leaves, Love beats him unconscious. Love and Joe lock Gil in the vault in the basement of the bakery. Love enlists the Quinn enforcer to investigate Gil's life and discovers that his son is a sexual predator; they confront him and he is disgusted causing him to commit suicide. Joe and Love decide to frame Gil for Natalie's death. Theo kisses Love after a heart-to-heart with each other at the bakery.

Theo calls Love from the police station about an incident. Theo then invites Love to ride a scooter with him and they end up having sex. Dottie gives Love advice. Love buys a pregnancy test and messages Forty as if she were a living person, confessing that she might be pregnant with Theo's baby. Love attends an event for Dottie, where she is taken out of her pregnancy scare. She hallucinates Forty, causing her to have an epiphany about her life. Theo warns Love that Matthew is spying on everyone at Madre Linda. She decides to keep Theo around to get more information from Matthew. Love unsuccessfully tries to spice things up with Joe, which leads to her having rebound sex with Theo. At a fundraiser, Love meets Marienne Bellamy. Sherry tells Love that she and Cary (Travis Van Winkle) are very attracted to her and Joe and that they should try to take her relationship to another level. Dottie is cut out of her family's life by Love because of her carelessness with Henry. Love discusses Sherry's proposal with Joe.

Joe and Love to meet with the Conrads and they are presented with a confidentiality agreement. Joe and Love invite the Conrads to their sexual encounter. Love realizes that Joe has someone other than her on her mind while she is having sex with Sherry, leading to an argument that causes Love to reveal out loud that she killed Natalie. The Conrads try to flee the house, but Joe and Love overpower them and put them in the cage. Theo tells Love to run away with him, believing Joe to be a violent husband upon seeing footage of an earlier argument between Love and Joe and offers to get Love a copy of the footage, which Love accepts. Sherry tries to bond with Love so that she and Cary are released from the cage. Love discovers that Joe has Cary's gun, gives the gun to the Conrads, and tells them that he would let one of them walk free while the other dies. Love finds Theo in the bakery, learns what she saw, and hits him with a fire extinguisher.

Love confesses to Joe that she attacked Theo and that he is in the basement of the bakery. She also talks about starting a new chapter in her and Joe's life by having a new baby. Love discovers Joe's bloody T-shirt and realizes that Marienne is the one Joe is obsessed with. Love takes Henry from Dante and Lansing's residence. Love cooks a special dinner for her and Joe, where she confronts him about the whole Marienne thing while Joe files for a divorce from her and confronts her about James' mysterious death. Love leaves the table to tend to a crying Henry. She returns and reveals that she accidentally killed James. She also reveals that she knew Joe would grab a knife and poisoned the handle of it, leaving him paralyzed. Love asks Marienne to come over to her house and then goes to drop off some orders for Kiki (Shannon Chan-Kent). Love returns and confronts Marienne and reveals that Joe killed her ex-husband. Marienne advises Love to leave Joe and listen to the voice inside her. Love reconsiders her actions after Marienne's words, draws the conclusion that her actions are unforgivable, and that Joe is the problem in her relationship.

In the end she realizes her mistakes and comes to the conclusion that in order to change she must kill Joe, she tries to kill him, but Joe kills her first.

Love is portrayed as a teenager by Olivia Ragan.

Ellie Alves 
Ellie Alves (Jenna Ortega; season 2) is Delilah's fifteen-year-old sister and Joe’s new neighbor in LA. She quickly befriends Joe and helps him establish an online presence. Joe learns that Ellie has befriended stand-up comic Henderson - whom Delilah reveals sexually assaulted her when underage - and accidentally murders Henderson after he drugs Ellie. Love's brother Forty later hires Ellie as an "intern" to help him draft a screenplay. Ellie becomes distraught when Delilah goes missing; Joe, who is preparing to leave LA, informs her that Delilah is dead and that he killed Henderson, and gives her money to move out of LA permanently. Joe continues to provide Ellie with monthly payments after moving into a suburb with Love.

Forty Quinn 
Forty Quinn (James Scully; season 2, special guest season 3) is Love's beloved and troubled twin brother. Forty is the heir to a self-care business started by his wealthy parents, who launched the grocery store Anavrin when he and Love were young. As a child, Forty was sexually abused by Sofia, the family's au pair, believing himself to be in love with her. Love murdered Sofia after drugging Forty, allowing him to believe he blacked out and killed her himself. Their parents elected to cover up the death to protect Forty, who grew up with severe unresolved trauma and developed an addiction to alcohol and drugs. Love made it her responsibility during adulthood to manage Forty's sobriety. 

Forty begins the series as Anavrin's spoiled, arrogant manager. He befriends Joe and attempts to use him to grow close to stand-up comic Henderson, to whom he has repeatedly attempted to pitch various film projects to no avail. Forty breaks his sobriety at one of Henderson's parties; Will takes him home and has sex with Love for the first time, though the two only disclose their relationship to Forty later on. Forty begins dating a woman named Amy Adam (Joe's ex Candace under an alias), who introduces him to Beck's posthumous memoir and encourages him to adapt it into a screenplay. He later learns that Joe is living in Los Angeles under an alias to escape Candace and cuts ties with her. As Joe is preparing to leave Los Angeles, Forty stages a kidnapping and has hired thugs confine he, Joe and Ellie (whom Forty hired as an intern) to a hotel suite to complete Forty's screenplay from start to finish. Forty later takes LSD (which he also gives to Joe) to enhance his creative process, and deduces that Beck was murdered not by her therapist (as is written in the book) but her ex-boyfriend. He confides to Joe that his believed role in Sofia's death led him to this insight.

Along the way, Forty has sex with Candace again, who tells him Joe is Beck's ex-boyfriend, who also attempted to murder Candace. Forty is skeptical but decides to talk to Beck's therapist Dr. Nicky (whom Joe framed for Beck's murder). He travels to New York to meet Nicky in prison, but Nicky warns him to stay away from Joe. Forty soon realizes Joe is indeed a serial killer and calls he and Love to Anavrin to warn Love to stay away from Joe. However, as he prepares to execute Joe at gunpoint, Forty is shot dead by police officer David Fincher, who followed Ellie to the scene. Forty is portrayed as a teenager by Anton Starkman.

Candace Stone 
Candace Stone (Ambyr Childers; season 2, recurring season 1) is Joe's ex-girlfriend. Candace was once an aspiring musician who cheated on Joe with Elijah, a record executive, in an attempt to get signed to the latter's label. Joe later murdered Elijah. When Candace admitted to Joe she no longer loved him, Joe kidnapped her and took her to the woods; when she attempted to escape, Joe hit her over the head and buried her, unaware she was still alive. Candace escaped her grave and attempted to report the incident to the police, who were unable to do anything due to lack of evidence.

Candace unexpectedly shows up at Joe's bookstore shortly after he kills Beck and vows revenge on him. She later follows Joe to Los Angeles (where he moved to escape her) and begins dating Forty Quinn under the alias "Amy Adam" to grow close to Joe. A suspicious Love hires a private investigator to look into Candace and learns that she is living under an alias; before leaving, Candace reveals to Love that Joe himself is living under a false identity (Will Bettelheim) and tried to murder her. Candace later finds the storage unit where Joe keeps a large glass cage and traps him inside with the corpse of his landlord, Delilah. She then calls Love to the storage unit to prove Joe's psychopathy, but Love, who had killed Delilah, murders Candace.

Delilah Alves 
Delilah Alves (Carmela Zumbado; season 2) is Ellie's older sister, Joe's landlord, and an investigative reporter. She confides to Joe that she was sexually assaulted by stand-up comedian Henderson while underage; Joe encourages her to expose his crimes. Joe himself attempts to help Delilah by breaking into Henderson's home and anonymously delivering her photographs of Henderson's other victims recovered from his basement, but Joe accidentally kills Henderson in a confrontation, and his death taints her investigation. Joe later advises Delilah to simply write about her own experience rather than seek justice for every one of his victims, as her story may prompt other victims to come forward on their own. Delilah and Joe begin a sexual relationship along the way. One day, Delilah finds a key in Joe's apartment leading to a storage unit where he keeps a large glass cage. Joe arrives before Delilah can leave and imprisons her in the cage, using electronic handcuffs timed to unlock after 16 hours (by which point Joe will have left LA). However, Love discovers the storage unit herself and murders Delilah to protect Joe.

Dottie Quinn 
Dottie Quinn (Saffron Burrows; season 3, recurring season 2) is Love and Forty's mother. She is the ex-wife of Ray and has a tumultuous relationship with her family.

Marienne Bellamy 
Marienne Bellamy (Tati Gabrielle; season 3–4) is a librarian and keen observer of the denizens of Madre Linda. Beneath her practical exterior, Marienne is hiding personal struggles that set her back, as she tries to create a better life for herself and her daughter. She is Joe and Dante’s coworker at the library and has a young daughter named Juliette. Her ex-boyfriend, Ryan, is a successful local television reporter and has full custody due to her past addiction.

Joe and Marienne begin as friends, but Joe soon becomes obsessed with her and gradually begins to gain her trust and romantic affection. Joe attempts to help her win her custody battle with Ryan, but ultimately ends up killing him. Love, having decided to kill Joe, calls Marienne to their house to kill her as well, but relents when she sees her daughter, and instead tells Marienne the truth about Joe. Marienne flees to Paris where she makes a living as an artist. Joe kills Love, fakes his death, then follows Marienne to Europe. He eventually tracks her down in London, where she has an exhibition; Marienne rebuffs Joe and calls him a murderer, but Joe, hoping to prove her wrong, lets her go. Joe is later ordered by a fixer working for Love's family to kill Marienne to tie up loose ends, but Joe instead pickpockets her necklace while she is at a train station leaving London and sends a photo of it to the fixer to make it appear he killed Marienne.

Joe is later revealed to have poisoned Marienne's coffee with a sedative and kidnapped her before she could leave London. He kept her in a temporary apartment for days where he fed her while she was restrained, then drugged her to sleep at night. Joe eventually moved her to a glass cage he built in a basement beneath an abandoned building. Upon imprisoning her, Joe suffered a psychotic break that resulted in a dissociation in his personality, causing him to forget his kidnapping of Marienne. As a result, Joe soon stopped bringing her food and water. Marienne is eventually found by Joe's student Nadia, who concocts a plan to help her escape: she fabricates texts on Marienne's phone making it look like she lost custody of her daughter - which Marienne would direct Joe to find - and gives Marienne ketamine to overdose on later, making it appear she committed suicide. Joe falls for the ruse and leaves Marienne on a park bench to look like she overdosed on heroin; Marienne escapes that night and reunites with her daughter in Paris, where she learns that Joe is now a celebrated figure in the news after his new girlfriend, Kate Lockwood, helped rehabilitate his public image.

Sherry Conrad 
Sherry Conrad (Shalita Grant; season 3) is a locally famous "momfluencer," admired by her social media followers for her well-crafted persona. She is Cary’s wife and they befriend Love and Joe after they move to Madre Linda.

Cary Conrad 
Cary Conrad (Travis Van Winkle; season 3) is a wealthy, charismatic, and self-proclaimed founder who runs his own supplement company. He is Sherry’s husband and they befriend Joe and Love after they move to Madre Linda.

Theo Engler 
Theo Engler (Dylan Arnold; season 3) is a troubled college student who has a strained relationship with his stepfather, Matthew Engler. He is the next door neighbor of the Goldbergs and becomes infatuated with Love.

Kate Galvin
Kate Galvin (Charlotte Ritchie; season 4), formerly known as Katherine Lockwood, is an art dealer in whom Joe becomes interested. She is the estranged daughter of Tom Lockwood, a powerful activist investor with whom she cut ties because of the harm his business dealings have done to the world. As a result, Kate chooses not to identify with the British upper class despite being surrounded by wealthy and aristocratic friends.

Kate begins the fourth season in a sexual relationship with Malcolm Harding, an obnoxious professor at the college where Joe teaches under his "Jonathan Moore" identity. After Malcolm is murdered by a killer stalking Joe, Joe follows Kate around to protect her, and the two become closer and eventually have sex. Their relationship escalates during a getaway to Lady Phoebe's family estate, where Kate reveals her family background to Joe. That night, Kate discovers her friend Gemma murdered in her bedroom, and she and Joe hide the body, after which Joe reveals he is being framed for Malcolm's murder. After the real killer, Rhys Montrose, imprisons Joe in an underground dungeon alongside Roald Walker-Burton, Kate's childhood friend, Kate rescues them. Days later, Kate asks Joe out on a date, but he declines. However, Joe eventually relents and admits his feelings for Kate, and the two begin dating. 

Kate's father soon arrives in London, where he proposes that Kate take over the family business. Kate vehemently declines, but Tom reveals he has bankrolled her every venture even after their estrangement, leaving her devastated. Joe later kills Tom and attempts suicide, but the police rescue him. Kate covers up Joe's involvement in the death of Rhys Montrose, which she learns was ordered by her father. Joe tells her his real name, and the two move back to New York City, where Kate takes over her father's company and reshapes it to have a more philanthropic intent. She helps rehabilitate Joe's public image, making him a celebrated figure in the media.

Lady Phoebe 
Lady Phoebe Borehall-Blaxworth (Tilly Keeper; season 4), is a wealthy social media influencer who is part of the royal family. She is romantically involved with Adam and has a dramatic yet bubbly personality.

Joe meets Phoebe at a party at Adam's elite social club, Sundry House, where he becomes heavily intoxicated on absinthe and says something to Phoebe that leaves her profoundly moved. Phoebe becomes intensely attracted to Joe as a result of this conversation and attempts to seduce him at her family estate, but Joe rejects her advances. Phoebe then confides that she is afraid Adam may not love her. After part of Phoebe's family estate burns down in a fire unwittingly set by Joe, she attends one of Kate's art fundraisers, where she is kidnapped by a deranged fan, Dawn Brown, only for Joe to rescue her. Adam proposes to Phoebe shortly thereafter, but she rejects him after learning the truth about his financial problems and infidelity from Dawn. However, Phoebe enters a spiral of PTSD following her kidnapping; Kate arranges her stay at a rehab facility, but Phoebe instead decides to marry Adam. However, she suffers a mental breakdown at her wedding and is hospitalized, while Kate's father has Adam killed to help repair Kate and Phoebe's relationship. Phoebe eventually recovers and becomes an English teacher in Thailand.

Nadia Farran
Nadia (Amy-Leigh Hickman; season 4) is one of Joe’s students. She is outspoken and competitive, and a lover of genre fiction. Joe initially enlists her help in finding the killer who has been stalking him, under the guise of writing a murder-mystery novel. Joe later learns that Nadia and Malcolm were in a sexual relationship, and retrieves a letter she wrote him from his apartment to avoid the scandal from going public.

Nadia begins dating her classmate Edward, with whom she often butts heads academically, and the two attend one of Kate's gallery auctions where they are surprised to see Joe. Nadia, a fan of Lady Phoebe's, goes to look for her, unaware that she has been kidnapped by Dawn Brown, a crazed fan. Joe, meanwhile, plants Simon Soo's severed ear in Dawn's bag to frame her for the "Eat the Rich" murders, and Nadia witnesses Dawn's arrest, becoming suspicious of Joe when she overhears Phoebe call him a "hero". Nadia soon breaks into Joe's office and finds a key which leads her to the basement of an abandoned building where Joe has kept Marienne imprisoned in a glass cage. A horrified Nadia makes a plan to help Marienne escape, fabricating texts on her phone making it look like Marienne lost custody of her daughter, and giving Marienne ketamine to make it look like she overdosed in response. Joe falls for the ruse and leaves Marienne in a park where she escapes later that night. Nadia, unaware of Marienne's whereabouts, looks for clues in Joe's apartment with Edward standing by. However, Joe finds her and leads her to Edward's slain corpse, then plants his knife on her to get her arrested for his murder. Joe, whose public image has been rehabilitated with Kate's help, notes that Nadia has remained in prison since.

Rhys Montrose
Rhys Montrose (Ed Speleers; season 4), is an author and mayoral hopeful whose memoir about his experiences in prison lifted him out of poverty. He quickly forms a connection with Joe over their similar personal backgrounds.

After a string of murders among London's elite dubbed the "Eat the Rich" killings, Joe discovers it was Rhys who committed the murders out of his apparent resentment towards the rich. However, Rhys is later revealed to be a figment of Joe's own imagination: Joe developed an obsessive interest in Rhys' life upon moving to London, finding commonalities between Rhys' rise from poverty and his own desire for moral redemption. Upon his kidnapping and imprisonment of Marienne Bellamy, Joe suffered a psychotic break that caused a rift in his identity, leading to recurring hallucinations of Rhys as a manifestation of his repressed, murderous impulses. Joe discovers this upon killing the real (innocent) Rhys in a blind rage. Joe's visions of Rhys persist despite this, and Joe attempts to expunge them by killing himself, seeing no other way to end his cycle of violence. However, the police rescue Joe and he moves back to New York City with Kate, who has helped rehabilitate his public image. As a result, Joe comes to accept his dark nature and continues seeing visions of Rhys.

Adam Pratt
Adam (Lukas Gage; season 4) is an American playboy who hails from a wealthy family and owns Sundry House, an elite London social club. He is dating Lady Phoebe and has a strained relationship with his father, who he typically consults to bail him out of debt from his failed business ventures. Adam eventually proposes to Lady Phoebe despite being unfaithful to her, hoping her family wealth will free him from his mounting debts, and furthermore help Sundry House expand into a franchise. Phoebe rejects his proposal upon learning of his intentions from an obsessed fan who briefly kidnaps her, but suffers a downward spiral of PTSD in the following days and returns to Adam for solace. Adam takes advantage of Phoebe's declining mental state and hastily marries her, but Phoebe experiences a nervous breakdown at her wedding and is hospitalized. Adam, meanwhile, is murdered by a group of hitmen posing as prostitutes, who Kate later learns were sent by her father, Tom Lockwood, in a ploy to help Kate mend her relationship with Phoebe.

Recurring characters

Introduced in season one 
 Lynn Lieser (Nicole Kang; season 1), one of Beck's rich friends.
 Annika Atwater (Kathryn Gallagher; season 1), one of Beck's friends and a social media influencer.
 Mr. Mooney (Mark Blum; season 1), the owner of Mooney's and Joe's former boss, who mentored him in restoring books. Mooney was a sadist who frequently locked Joe inside the reinforced glass cage used to store old books.
 Ron (Daniel Cosgrove; season 1), the parole officer boyfriend of Claudia. He is abusive towards Claudia and has an abrasive relationship with Paco. Joe kills him after he attempts to assault Paco. 
 Claudia (Victoria Cartagena; season 1), Paco's mother and Ron’s girlfriend. She is a nurse at the local hospital and is abused by Ron. She leaves New York for California at the end of season one. 
 Benjamin "Benji" Ashby III (Lou Taylor Pucci; season 1), Beck's wealthy, toxic hipster ex-boyfriend. Joe kills him with a peanut oil (which he is deathly allergic to) tainted drink. 
 Blythe (Hari Nef; season 1), a rival graduate student to Beck. She later begins dating, and moves in with Ethan. 
 Dr. Nicky (John Stamos; season 1, special guest season 2), Beck's therapist.

Introduced in season two 
 Will Bettelheim (Robin Lord Taylor; season 2), a hacker who deals with unsavory clients as part of his job and whose identity Joe briefly assumes. Joe keeps Will trapped in his glass cage while taking on his name, but eventually allows him to leave in an effort to overcome his homicidal tendencies. Will moves to the Philippines to live with a woman he had met online.
 Calvin (Adwin Brown; season 2), a manager at Anavrin, a trendy high-end grocery store.
 Sandy Goldberg (Magda Apanowicz; season 2, guest season 3), Joe's mother, who was abused by Joe's violent father throughout Joe's childhood and frequently made plans to run away with other men. After a young Joe murdered his father to protect his mother, Sandy left home with another man and abandoned Joe, who spent the remainder of his childhood in group homes.
 Joshua "Henderson" Bunter (Chris D'Elia; season 2), a famous stand-up comedian in Los Angeles. He has a history of drugging and sexually assaulting underage girls, including Will's landlord Delilah - who is attempting to protect her younger sister Ellie - who has befriended Henderson - from the same fate. Joe breaks into Henderson's home and discovers photographs of his victims that he anonymously delivers to Delilah to help her in exposing Henderson's crimes, but the nondescript nature of the images does little to corroborate her story. Joe later breaks into the home a second time to spy on Henderson while he is with Ellie, whom Henderson attempts to drug. However, Joe drugs Henderson and brings him to the basement to confront him; when Henderson tries to escape, Joe accidentally kills him and disposes of his body.
 Gabe Miranda (Charlie Barnett; season 2), a successful acupuncturist and Love's oldest friend and closest confidant. After Love and Joe break up, Gabe treats Joe to acupuncture therapy and helps him realize the importance of self-love. 
 Lucy Sprecher (Marielle Scott; season 2), an edgy-chic literary agent and Sunrise's partner. She and Sunrise soon get married.
 Sunrise Darshan Cummings (Melanie Field; season 2), a stay-at-home lifestyle blogger and Lucy's partner. She and Lucy eventually get married.
 David Fincher (Danny Vasquez; season 2), an LAPD officer and Delilah’s friend.

Introduced in season three 
 Dante Ferguson (Ben Mehl; season 3), a librarian who retains his wit and equanimity no matter what the day brings. A veteran whose eyesight was damaged, Dante is a dedicated family man with a husband and two stepchildren who longs to expand his family, and delights in helping his friends with their children.
 Andrew (Christopher O'Shea; season 3), an adoring member of Sherry's cliquish inner circle. A fit stay-at-home dad, Andrew is dependably tuned in to the latest town gossip.
 Jackson (Bryan Safi; season 3), Andrew's wry husband; they have an enviable, loving marriage. Despite Jackson's high-powered job as a tech attorney, he's managed to stay humble.
 Gil Brigham (Mackenzie Astin; season 3), a mild-mannered geology professor is thoughtful, friendly, and genuinely good-hearted if a bit vanilla and naïve.
 Brandon (Christopher Sean; season 3), Kiki's husband, who struck it rich in his mid-20s as a tech investor, is now a stay-at-home dad for his kids.
 Kiki (Shannon Chan-Kent; season 3), a devoted member of Sherry's cliquish "mean girl" friend group. She is a wife, mother and life coach who enjoys a life of entitlement, frequenting mid-day fitness classes and enjoying lengthy gossip sessions at the local café.
 Paulie (Mauricio Lara; season 3), a friend of Joe's when he was a child. Savvy with hard-earned smarts beyond his years, Paulie attempts to help his friend toughen up and negotiate the tough world of the boys home.
 Matthew Engler (Scott Speedman; season 3), an affluent CEO, husband and "uncommunicative" father who is reserved, at times mysterious, and has a tendency to be withdrawn.
 Dr. Chandra (Ayelet Zurer; season 3), a chic, brusque, but extremely seasoned couple's therapist who has every intention of getting to the bottom of her patients' issues.
 Ryan Goodwin (Scott Michael Foster; season 3), a local television reporter. Ryan is a well-liked single dad who has overcome a history of addiction but has secrets, including a controlling, calculating demeanor that he reserves for those closest to him and anyone who gets in his way.
 Nurse Fiona (Kim Shaw; season 3), Joe’s nurse at the group home, who was the first woman he grew an attachment to.

Introduced in season four 
 Malcolm Harding (Stephen Hagan), a professor at Joe’s college, as well as his landlord. An arrogant and obnoxious man, he is Kate's boyfriend, although he is known to be disloyal, including having an affair with student Nadia.
 Elliot Tannenberg (Adam James), the Quinn family fixer who gives Joe his new identity.
 Simon Soo (Aidan Cheng), a tortured artist and Sophie’s brother. He is revealed to claim ownership of art completed by younger, lower-class artists.
 Sophie Soo (Niccy Lin), a wealthy social media influencer and Simon’s sister.
 Gemma Graham-Greene (Eve Austin), a pompous heiress. She is long-time friends with Phoebe and Kate and known to be derogatory to her lower-class staff.
 Blessing Bosede (Ozioma Whenu), a Nigerian princess in Phoebe's friend group.
 Connie (Dario Coates), a member of Phoebe's friend group struggling with drug and alcohol addiction.
 Edward (Brad Alexander), one of Joe’s students and Nadia’s classmate who frequently butts heads with her in classroom discussions.
 Vic (Sean Pertwee), Phoebe’s bodyguard.
 Roald Walker-Burton (Ben Wiggins), a wealthy and pompous photographer who is obsessed with Kate.
 Dawn Brown (Alison Pargeter), a tabloid photographer who has a parasocial obsession with Lady Phoebe.
 Tom Lockwood (Greg Kinnear), Kate's estranged American father who is a powerful activist shareholder in numerous shady business dealings.

Guest characters

Introduced in season one 
 Professor Paul Leahy (Reg Rogers), Beck's graduate school advisor who has a sexual interest in her.
 Edwin Beck (Michael Park), Beck's father.
 Nancy Whitesell (Emily Bergl), Edwin's new wife, and Beck's stepmother.
 Officer Nico (Michael Maize), a Greenwich police officer.
 Raj (Gerrard Lobo), a med student and an old friend of Beck and Peach.
 Karen Minty (Natalie Paul), Paco's babysitter and Joe's new girlfriend after his short-lived breakup with Beck.
 Ross (Ryan Andes), a private investigator hired by Peach's family to look into her death.

Introduced in season two 
 Jasper Krenn (Steven W. Bailey), a criminal to whom Will owes money.
 Kathy Griffin, a eulogist at Henderson's funeral.
 Ray Quinn (Michael Reilly Burke), Love and Forty's father.
 Alec Grigoryan (David Paladino), a private investigator hired by Love to investigate Candace.
 Gigi (Haven Everly), Will's fiancée.
 Milo Warrington (Andrew Creer), James' best friend and Love's new boyfriend after her breakup with Joe.
 James Kennedy (Daniel Durant), Love's deaf and deceased husband who died of cancer.
 Rachel (Madeline Zima), Candace/Amy's roommate who knows Krav Maga.
 Sofia (Brooke Johnson), Forty's au pair lover who was murdered by Love.

Introduced in season three 
 Natalie Engler (Michaela McManus), Joe's next-door neighbor and the subject of his growing affection. Natalie is in an unhappy marriage to tech mogul Matthew Engler, and attempts to initiate an affair with Joe, who declines out of loyalty to Love, despite his obsession with Natalie. Love murders Natalie after finding Joe's collection of her paraphernalia.
 Detective Ruthie Falco (Romy Rosemont), a detective searching for Natalie.
 Detective Acacia Kim (Georgia Leva), a detective searching for Natalie.
 Margaret Brigham (Terryn Westbrook), Gil’s wife and Zoe and Alan’s mother.
 The doctor (Mercedes Colon) who treats Henry when he has measles.
 Derek (Noah Bentley), a bully from Joe’s past in the orphanage.
 Jean Peck (Marcia Cross), a business associate at Matthew’s company.
 Dr. Laura Kealy (Ginifer King), a successful self-help author for working moms.
 Leez (Monica Day), a talented coder who works for Matthew’s company.

Notes

References 

You
You (TV series)